David Eugene Ray, Jr. (born September 19, 1944) is an American former professional gridiron football placekicker in the National Football League (NFL) and Canadian Football League (CFL). He played college football at the University of Alabama as a kicker and wide receiver. He was an All-American kicker in 1964.

Professional career
Ray was selected in the 16th round (243rd overall) of the 1966 NFL Draft. He then played for the Montreal Alouettes in 1968 where he made 11 of 18 field goal attempts. Ray joined the Los Angeles Rams for the 1969 season and played for the team for six seasons where he connected on 110 field goals out of 178 attempts.

References

1944 births
Living people
Players of American football from Alabama
People from Phenix City, Alabama
American football placekickers
Alabama Crimson Tide football players
All-American college football players
Canadian football placekickers
Los Angeles Rams players
Montreal Alouettes players